Charles Lloyd (22 August 1748 – 16 January 1828) was an English banker, philanthropist, Quaker preacher and abolitionist.

Life and career
Born in Birmingham on 22 August 1748, Lloyd was the second son of Sampson Lloyd, Quaker manufacturer and banker, a member of the Society of Friends, by his second wife, Rachel, daughter of Nehemiah Champion III of Bristol. Lloyd was educated at a school run by Ephraim Goodere, and then began work in his father's counting-house. 

After his father's death, Lloyd carried on the banking business with success. He was also a preacher and influential Quaker. Lloyd was a pioneer abolitionist working for the emancipation of the West Indian slaves, a supporter of the Bible Society and of non-sectarian education, and one of the founders of the Birmingham General Hospital.

Lloyd died on 16 January 1828. His residence, Bingley House, near Birmingham, gave its name to Bingley Hall.

Personal life
Lloyd married, on 13 May 1774, Mary, daughter of James Farmer of Birmingham; they had 15 children. His eldest son was Charles Lloyd (1775–1839) the poet; his eldest daughter, Priscilla, married Christopher Wordsworth. Another daughter, Anna Braithwaite, was a Quaker preacher who toured Britain, Ireland and the United States several times.

Works
Lloyd published a number of translations:

Translation of the Twenty-fourth Book of the Iliad of Homer, for private circulation in 1807 and 1810, Birmingham; in heroic couplets, after William Cowper, anonymous.
The first seven books of the Odyssey, 1810, Birmingham. 
Metrical translations of Horace, between 1808 and 1812, in the Gentleman's Magazine.
The Epistles of Horace translated into English Verse, 1812, Birmingham, printed for private circulation.
Translation in heroic couplets of the Alcaic ode on the death of Samuel Parr by Charles Wordsworth,  in Wordsworth's Annals of my Early Life, London, 1891.

Notes

Attribution

1748 births
1828 deaths
English abolitionists
English bankers
English people of Welsh descent
English philanthropists
English Quakers
Lloyd family of Birmingham
Lloyds Banking Group people